Bienestar Nacional (lit. National Well-being) is a political party in Guatemala.

History
The political party was established in 2002, although it never appeared on the list of the Supreme Electoral Tribunal until 2015. It was at risk of being suspended due to lack of affiliates, but was later accepted by the Supreme Electoral Tribunal.

Electoral results

Presidential elections

Legislative elections

References

External links

2002 establishments in Guatemala
Centrist parties in North America
Political parties established in 2002
Political parties in Guatemala